General elections were held in Uruguay on 31 October, alongside a constitutional referendum. The result was a victory for the Broad Front, marking the first time a party other than the Colorado Party or National Party had held power since the two parties were formed in the 1830s.

Broad Front leader Tabaré Vázquez was elected president on his third attempt after his party won just over 50% of the vote, enough for him to win the presidency in a single round. To date, this is the only time that a presidential election has been decided without a runoff since the two-round system was introduced in 1999. The Broad Front also won majorities in the Chamber of Deputies and the Senate.

Presidential candidates

Results

By department

Notes

References

External links
Politics Data Bank at the Social Sciences School – Universidad de la República (Uruguay)

Uruguay
Elections in Uruguay
General election
Uruguay
Tabaré Vázquez